Sarah Jane Brett (born 1974) is an Irish radio presenter, who broadcasts on BBC Radio Ulster breakfast show.

Early life
Brett was born in Northampton. Her parents moved to Portnoo, a village beside Narin in the west of County Donegal, Ireland, when she was four. She attended St. Columba's Comprehensive School in Glenties, County Donegal.

She enrolled on a journalism course in Derry in her mid-20s.

Career

Journalism
Brett did a work placement at the Sunday Tribune in Dublin. She worked at the Belfast Telegraph for eight years.

Radio Foyle
Brett joined BBC Radio Foyle in 2004, later occasionally working on Good Morning Ulster and Talk Back at BBC Radio Ulster. She worked with Enda McClafferty on the Breakfast show from 2010 and won the News Broadcaster of the Year award at the 2013 Phonographic Performance Ireland awards.

Radio Five Live
In September 2014 Brett joined Radio Five Live on the Afternoon Edition Monday-Thursday programme from 1.00 pm to 4.00 pm, beginning with Dan Walker. In May 2019 she replaced Phil Williams as host of the late evening show, 10.30 pm to 1.00 am, Monday to Wednesday.

Radio Ulster
In February 2020, it was announced that Brett would be one of the new co-presenters of Good Morning Ulster on BBC Radio Ulster with Chris Buckler.

Personal life
Brett gave birth to a son in 2014. Her husband is Terry Coyle, whom she met in Derry, and who is from Creggan, Derry.

See also
 Stephen Nolan

References

External links
Good Morning Ulster (BBC Radio Ulster)

1974 births
BBC Radio 5 Live presenters
Irish radio presenters
Irish women radio presenters
Radio personalities from Northern Ireland
People from County Donegal
Mass media people from Derry (city)
Living people